Laurance Willemse (born 24 March 1962) is a South African cricket umpire. He has stood in matches in the 2016–17 Sunfoil 3-Day Cup and the 2016–17 CSA Provincial One-Day Challenge tournaments. He also stood in a tour match between the South African Invitational XI and England XI in December 2009.

References

External links
 

1962 births
Living people
South African cricket umpires
People from Beaufort West